John Gaines may refer to:
John P. Gaines (1795–1857), lawyer, U.S. Representative from Kentucky, Mexican–American War officer, Governor of Oregon Territory
John W. Gaines (1860–1926), lawyer, U.S. Representative from Tennessee
John Gaines, character in Babies for Sale

See also
John Gaines Miller, U.S. representative from Missouri